Ben Martino (born September 13, 2002), is an American professional soccer player who plays as a goalkeeper for Nashville SC in Major League Soccer.

Career statistics

Club

Notes

References

2002 births
Living people
Association football goalkeepers
American soccer players
Homegrown Players (MLS)
Nashville SC players
Philadelphia Union II players
Soccer players from Pennsylvania
USL Championship players
Virginia Tech Hokies men's soccer players